Pseudopostega turquinoensis is a moth of the family Opostegidae. It was described by Donald R. Davis and Jonas R. Stonis, 2007. It is known from south-eastern Cuba.

The length of the forewings is 2.8–3.3 mm. Adults have been recorded in July.

Etymology
The species name is in reference to the type locality, Turquino.

References

Opostegidae
Moths of Cuba
Endemic fauna of Cuba
Moths described in 2007